Marlene Marlowe Investigates is a short-lived BBC children's programme based on the book by Roy Apps about an incompetent detective and her many adventures.

Episodes

Series One
Transmitted: 25 September 1993 – 1 January 1994

 "The Jininsky Tapes Affair" (6 episodes)
 "The Puddlethorpe Carnival Caper" (4 episodes)
 "The Great Christmas Pudding Mystery" (5 episodes)

Series Two
Transmitted: 24 September – 31 December 1994

 "The Hitmey Hootson Kidnapping" (3 episodes)
 "The Phantom Floppy Fiddler" (3 episodes)
 "The Hound of Puddlethorpe Hall" (3 episodes)
 "The Claud Ward Fraud Hoard" (3 episodes)
 "The Puddlethorpe Pantomime Palaver" (3 episodes)

References

External links

BBC children's television shows
1990s British children's television series
1993 British television series debuts
1994 British television series endings
British detective television series
English-language television shows
1990s British mystery television series